= Itto titrit =

- Directed by: Mohamed Abbazi
- Written by: Mohamed Abbazi
- Starring: Nisrine Fouad Ichou, Amine Jebbour, Hadda Ou Abbou, Sidi Mou Chakri
- Cinematography: Abdelkrim Derkaoui
- Edited by: Mehdi Boudkhili
- Music by: Brahim Fribgane
- Release date: 2008
- Running time: 120 minutes
- Country: Morocco
- Language: Berber

Itto titrit (French title: L'etoile du matin) is a 2008 Moroccan film directed by Mohamed Abbazi. It was screened at the 10th edition of the National Film Festival held in Tangier, as well as in Algeria and in Doha.

== Cast ==
- Nisrine Fouad
- Amine Jebbor
- Sidi Moh Chakri
- Mustapha Qaderi
- Hadda Ouabbou
- Saadia Ibouda
